Thunder Mountain is a 1935 American Western film directed by David Howard, written by Daniel Jarrett and Don Swift, and starring George O'Brien, Barbara Fritchie, Frances Grant, Morgan Wallace, George "Gabby" Hayes and Edward LeSaint. It is based on the novel Thunder Mountain by Zane Grey. The film was released on September 27, 1935, by 20th Century Fox.

Plot

Cast
George O'Brien as Kal Emerson
Barbara Fritchie as Sydney Blair
Frances Grant as Nugget
Morgan Wallace as Rand Leavitt
George "Gabby" Hayes as Foley 
Edward LeSaint as Samuel Blair
Dean Benton as Steve Sloan
William Bailey as Cliff Borden
Sid Jordan as Warns Leavitt

References

External links 
 

1935 films
Films based on works by Zane Grey
20th Century Fox films
American Western (genre) films
1935 Western (genre) films
Films directed by David Howard
American black-and-white films
Fox Film films
1930s English-language films
1930s American films